Anna Gasser (born 16 August 1991) is an Austrian snowboarder, competing in slopestyle and big air. She lives in Millstatt. She is the 2018 and 2022 Olympic Champion in Big air.

Gasser qualified for the 2014 Winter Olympics and showed the best result in the qualification round, directly qualifying for the final. In 2017 Gasser won Gold in the Big air event at the Snowboard World Championships in Spain. Gasser also had a successful 2017 X Games performance winning gold in Slopestyle  and bronze in Big air in Hafjell, and silver for Big air in Aspen.

Career
Anna Gasser started to compete in snowboarding in the 2010/2011 season. Before competing in slopestyle, Gasser was part of the Austrian National Gymnastics Team. At FIS Snowboarding World Championships 2013 Gasser finished 18th. Her best World Cup result and the only podium finish before the 2014 Olympics was the third-place finish in Stoneham on 19 January 2014.

In November 2013, Gasser became the first female snowboarder to perform a Cab Double Cork 900 kicker, a double salto backwards with a half-turn.

Gasser won 3 X Games medals in the 2017 season. She also won Gold in slopestyle at the Burton US Open and Gold at the snowboarding World Championships receiving a score of 100.

In 2018 Gasser became the first woman to land a cab triple underflip.

2014 Winter Olympics
Gasser qualified first for the slopestyle final event. However, she fell in both runs for the final event and was classified tenth. Aimee Fuller who was a British competitor who had been eliminated earlier, joined the BBC Sport team for the final of her event, which included Gasser. Fuller and the other members of the commentary team, Ed Leigh and Tim Warwood were criticised for their reaction when Gasser fell during her final run. The incident drew more than 300 complaints.

2018 Winter Olympics
Anna Gasser won gold in the inaugural Big air event with a total score of 185 points. She also competed in the women's slopestyle final, where she finished 15th.

2022 Winter Olympics
She successfully defended her Olympic Big air title by landing a Cab Double Cork 1260 in her final run.

References

1991 births
Living people
Austrian female snowboarders
Olympic snowboarders of Austria
Snowboarders at the 2014 Winter Olympics
Snowboarders at the 2018 Winter Olympics
Snowboarders at the 2022 Winter Olympics
Medalists at the 2018 Winter Olympics
Medalists at the 2022 Winter Olympics
Olympic gold medalists for Austria
Olympic medalists in snowboarding
Sportspeople from Villach